Horgan (also Romanized as Horgān and Hargān; also known as Hārgūn, Herkān, and Horgun) is a village in Horgan Rural District, in the Central District of Neyriz County, Fars Province, Iran. At the 2006 census, its population was 100, in 25 families.

References 

Populated places in Neyriz County